Entergy Texas (formerly Gulf States Utilities (GSU)) is an electric power generation and distribution company headquartered in The Woodlands, Texas. The company was founded in 1911 as Eastern Texas Electric, a holding company for Stone & Webster. On August 25, 1925, Gulf States Utilities Company was incorporated in the state of Texas.

The company grew and in 1979 moved its headquarters into the Edison Plaza office tower, which is still the tallest building in Beaumont. Its older headquarters, the Liberty-Pearl building (Formerly the Edson Hotel from 1929 to 1955), which still houses a lot of its telecomm equipment including the microwave radio systems, is still the second tallest building in Beaumont. Also in the late 1970s, construction began on the River Bend Station nuclear power plant. Cost overruns on the nuclear plant, high interest rates of 24-30%, a CEO of GSU who wanted a "nuke plant in the company" and a downturn in the regional economy in the early to mid-1980s nearly drove GSU into bankruptcy. In fact, trading of company stock was halted on the New York Stock Exchange one day as it tumbled down over 75% and eventually stopped at less than $2 a share. Former chief financial officer, Joseph L. Donnelly, Jr., has been credited with preventing the company from filing for Chapter 11 and was its CEO. (see link below)
GSU was absorbed by Entergy Corporation January 1, 1994 after first accepting a $19 per share offer from SWEPCO. Entergy's CEO at the time, Edwin Lupeburger, demanded another shot at buying GSU. The Entergy Board of Directors had a late night conference call and the next morning, tendered a $20 per share offer to GSU. GSU then had to pay SWEPCO a reported $10million to back out of the deal with them. At the time, GSU had 578,000 customers across southern Louisiana and East Texas. Edison Plaza was used by Entergy as its Texas headquarters. In 1999, Joe Domino, a well-respected longtime employee who started as an engineer and later served as Sabine Station plant (near Bridge City) manager, began his 14 year tenure as president of Entergy Texas. The River Bend Station continued to be a thorn in the side of its new owners due to lawsuits by the project's investors and fines levied by the Nuclear Regulatory Commission over safety problems at the plant.

Gulf States Utilities is still a legally incorporated entity in the state of Texas.  However, recently Entergy changed GSU's Texas name from Entergy Gulf States  to Entergy Texas, Inc. and merged the GSU Louisiana service territory with its Entergy-Louisiana unit. Entergy Texas notified the Public Utility Commission of Texas that it would not be joining the Texas Interconnection operated by ERCOT, but would stay regulated and part of the massive Eastern Interconnection (one of the two major power grids in the US besides Texas' own which covers 75% of the state and has only DC Direct Current ties to other states). Only ONE time was the tie connection in Dayton, Texas between GSU/Entergy and the Texas Interconnection (via CenterPoint Energy) ever used; after Hurricane Ike to provide power to the water pumps along the north side of Lake Houston and other affected areas. This was done after Texas Governor Rick Perry ordered CenterPoint to request Entergy to close the tie. In 2013, Joe Domino was replaced by Sallie Rainer, which began the transition of Entergy Texas to The Woodlands.

References

External links

 
 

Electric power companies of the United States
Companies based in Beaumont, Texas
Nuclear power companies of the United States
Entergy
History of Beaumont, Texas